Watch Your Step may refer to:

Albums
Watch Your Step (Raised Fist album), 2001
Watch Your Step (Ted Hawkins album) or the title song, 1982
Watch Your Step, by Gonzalez, 1980

Songs
"Watch Your Step" (Bobby Parker song), 1961
"Watch Your Step" (Elvis Costello song), 1981
"Watch Your Step", by Disclosure from Energy, 2020

Other uses
Watch Your Step (film), a 1922 American silent comedy film
Watch Your Step (musical), a 1914 Irving Berlin musical